Boyer is a surname.

Boyer may also refer to:

Places

Antarctica
 Mount Boyer, Ellsworth Land
 Boyer Spur, Palmer Land
 Boyer Glacier, Victoria Land
 Boyer Bluff, in the Churchill Mountains
 Boyer Rocks

Canada
 Boyer River (Alberta)
 Boyer River (Quebec)
 Boyer Strait, Nunavut
 Boyer 164, an Indian reserve in Alberta

France
 Boyer, Loire, in the Loire département of France
 Boyer, Saône-et-Loire, in the Saône-et-Loire département of France

United States
 Boyer, Iowa, an unincorporated community
 Boyer Township, Crawford County, Iowa
 Boyer, Mississippi, an unincorporated community
 Boyer, Missouri, an unincorporated community
 Boyer, Nevada, a ghost town
 Boyers, Pennsylvania, an unincorporated village
 Boyertown, Pennsylvania, a borough
 Boyer, West Virginia, an unincorporated community
 Boyer River, a tributary of the Missouri River in Iowa

Elsewhere
 Boyer, Tasmania, Australia
 1215 Boyer, an asteroid

Other uses
 an alternative term for a bojort, a type of sailing vessel
 Boyer Oval, a sports venue in New Norfolk, Tasmania
 Boyer College of Music and Dance, Temple University, Philadelphia, Pennsylvania, United States
 Boyer Gallery, a folk art museum in Belleville, Kansas, United States
 Boyer rifle, a type of flintlock rifle invented around 1800
 Boyer Glover, 18th century watch and clock maker in London
 Boyer–Lindquist coordinates
 Boyer–Moore string-search algorithm
 Boyer (candy company), a candy manufacturer in Altoona, Pennsylvania, United States

See also
 Boyer Brothers, a candy company in Altoona, Pennsylvania, United States